Micheline Desmazières (born 23 February 1926) is a French retired alpine skier who competed in the 1948 Winter Olympics.

References

External links
 

1926 births
Possibly living people
French female alpine skiers
Olympic alpine skiers of France
Alpine skiers at the 1948 Winter Olympics